The Church Commissioners is a body which administers the property assets of the Church of England. It was established in 1948 and combined the assets of Queen Anne's Bounty, a fund dating from 1704 for the relief of poor clergy, and of the Ecclesiastical Commissioners formed in 1836. The Church Commissioners are a registered charity regulated by the Charity Commission for England and Wales, and are liable for the payment of pensions to retired clergy whose pensions were accrued before 1998 (subsequent pensions are the responsibility of the Church of England Pensions Board).

The secretary (and chief executive) of the Church Commissioners is Gareth Mostyn.

History 
The Church Building Act 1818 granted money and established the Church Building Commission to build churches in the cities of the Industrial Revolution. These churches became known variously as Commissioners' churches, Waterloo churches or Million Act churches. The Church Building Commission became the Ecclesiastical Commissioners in 1836.

An earlier Ecclesiastical Duties and Revenues Commission had been set up under the first brief administration of Sir Robert Peel in 1835 with a wide remit, "to consider the State of the Established Church in England and Wales, with reference to Ecclesiastical Duties and Revenues" (Minutes of the Commission, 9 February 1835); this body redistributed wealth between the dioceses and changed diocesan boundaries, and the permanent Ecclesiastical Commission was formed the following year.

The Church Commissioners were established in 1948 as a merger of Queen Anne’s Bounty and the Ecclesiastical Commissioners, following the passage, by the National Assembly of the Church of England, of the Church Commissioners Measure 1947.

In 1992 it was revealed that the Church Commissioners had lost £500m through over-commitment of the fund leading to poor investment decisions. This figure was later revised up to £800m, a third of their assets.

The value of the commissioners' assets was around £5.5 billion as at the end of 2012. By September 2016, it was valued at £7 billion. The income is used for the payment of pensions to retired clergy whose pensions were accrued before 1998 (subsequent pensions are the responsibility of the Church of England Pensions Board) and a range of other commitments including supporting the ministries of bishops and cathedrals and funding various diocesan and parish missions initiatives.

In June 2022, the Commissioners acknowledged early links of Queen Anne's Bounty to the Atlantic slave trade. They and the Archbishop of Canterbury apologised. In January 2023 the Commissioners announced that they were setting up a fund of £100 million to be spent over the next nine years on addressing historic links with slavery.

The Commissioners also oversee pastoral reorganisation, the consent of the commissioners being required for establishing or dissolving team and group ministries, uniting, creating, or dissolving benefices and parishes, and the closing of consecrated church buildings and graveyards.

The Church Commissioners are now based at Church House, Westminster, London, having long occupied No. 1 Millbank. The Millbank building was sold in 2005 to the House of Lords for accommodation of members and staff; the commissioners completed the move to Church House in 2007. They used to be an exempt charity under English law, and is now a registered charity regulated by the Charity Commission for England and Wales.

The secretary (and chief executive) of the Church Commissioners is Gareth Mostyn.

Responsibilities 
The Church Commissioners have the following responsibilities:

 Funding mission in churches, dioceses and cathedrals.
 Pastoral reorganisation (including mergers of parishes and benefices); supported by the Pastoral Team.
 Clergy payroll ensuring clergy are paid their stipend.
 Managing the production of Crockford's Clerical Directory.
 Managing the Lambeth Palace Library and the Church of England Record Centre.

Portfolio

The CC portfolio in 2020 is extensive, worth around £9.2 billion and includes the Hyde Park Estate and a 10% stake in the MetroCentre shopping centre. The CC are the 13th largest landowner in the UK. The CC own a significant amount of rural land and sometimes promote this through Local Plan processes.

List of commissioners
There are 33 Church Commissioners, of whom 27 make up the board of governors as the main policy-making body, with a further 6 who are officers of state or Government ministers. Board members are either elected by the General Synod of the Church of England, or appointed by either the archbishops or the Crown. The board of governors is composed of all of the commissioners apart from the First Lord of the Treasury, the Lord President of the Council, the Lord Chancellor, the Secretary of State for Culture, Media and Sport, the Speaker of the House of Commons, and the Lord Speaker.

The 33 commissioners are as follows:

Church Estates Commissioners
The Church Estates Commissioners are three lay people who represent the Church Commissioners in the General Synod of the Church of England. The first and second commissioners are appointed by the British monarch, and the third commissioner is appointed by the Archbishop of Canterbury. They are based at Church House, Westminster, having previously had offices at No. 1 Millbank, London.

First Church Estates Commissioners
The First Church Estates Commissioner is appointed by the British Monarch.

 1850–1878: The Earl of Chichester
 1878–1905: The Earl Stanhope
 1905–1931: Sir Lewis Dibdin
 1931–1938: Sir George Middleton
 1939–1954: Sir Philip Baker Wilbraham
 1954–1969: The Lord Silsoe
 1969–1982: Sir Ronald Harris
 1983–1993: Sir Douglas Lovelock
 1993–1999: Sir Michael Colman
 1999–2001: John Sclater
 2002–2017: Sir Andreas Whittam Smith
 2017–2021: Loretta Minghella
 2021–present: Alan Smith

Second Church Estates Commissioners
The Second Church Estates Commissioner is appointed by the Crown. They are now always a Member of Parliament from the party in government, and have additional duties as a link between the British Parliament and the Church.

 1850–1858: Sir John Shaw Lefevre
 1858–1859: The Viscount Eversley
 1859–1865: Edward Pleydell Bouverie
 1865–1866: Henry Austin Bruce
 1866–1868: John Robert Mowbray
 1869–1874: Sir Thomas Dyke Acland
 1874–1879: George Cubitt
 1879–1880: Thomas Salt
 1880–1885: Evelyn Ashley
 1885–1886: Sir Henry Selwin-Ibbetson
 1886–1886: Thomas Dyke Acland
 1886–1892: Sir Henry Selwin-Ibbetson
 1892–1892: Charles Algernon Whitmore
 1892–1895: George Leveson Gower
 1895–1906: Sir Lees Knowles
 1906–1906: Francis Stevenson
 1906–1907: Charles Hobhouse
 1907–1910: James Tomkinson
 1910–1918: Sir Charles Nicholson
 1919–1922: Sir William Mount
 1923–1924: John Birchall
 1924–1924: George Middleton
 1924–1929: John Birchall
 1929–1931: George Middleton
 1931–1943: Sir Richard Denman
 1943–1945: Sir John Mills
 1945–1950: Thomas Burden
 1950–1951: Sir Richard Acland
 1951–1957: Sir John Crowder
 1957–1962: Sir Hubert Ashton
 1962–1964: Sir John Arbuthnot
 1964–1970: Lancelot Mallalieu
 1970–1974: Sir Marcus Worsley
 1974–1974: Edward Bishop
 1974–1979: Terence Walker
 1979–1987 Sir William van Straubenzee
 1987–1997: Michael Alison
 1997–2010: Sir Stuart Bell
 2010–2015: Sir Tony Baldry
 2015–2020: Dame Caroline Spelman
 2020–present: Andrew Selous

Third Church Estates Commissioners
The Third Church Estates Commissioner is appointed by the Archbishop of Canterbury.

 1850–1856: Henry Goulburn
 1856–1858: Spencer Horatio Walpole
 1858–1862: William Deedes
 1862–1866: Spencer Horatio Walpole
 1866–1871: Edward Howes
 1871–1892: Sir John Robert Mowbray
 1892–1895: Sir Michael Hicks Beach
 1895–1926: The Lord Stuart of Wortley
 1926–1948: The Lord Daryngton
 1948–1952: The Lord Tovey
 1952–1954: Sir Malcolm Trustram Eve
 1954–1962: Sir James Brown
 1962–1972: Sir Hubert Ashton
 1972–1981: Dame Betty Ridley
 1981-1989: The Revd Betsy Howarth
 1989–1999: Margaret Heather Laird
 1999–2005: The Viscountess Brentford
 2006–2012: Timothy Walker
 2013–2018: Andrew Mackie
 2018–2022: Eve Poole
 2022-present: Canon Flora Winfield

See also

Allchurches Trust
Churches Conservation Trust

References

External links
The Church Commissioners
 Church Commissioners Measure 1947 at the UK Statute Law Database
 Church Commissioners Measure 1970 at the UK Statute Law Database

Christian organizations established in 1948
1948 establishments in the United Kingdom
Christian charities based in the United Kingdom
Religion in the City of Westminster
Church of England
Charities based in London
Anglican organizations established in the 20th century
Exempt charities
Church of England societies and organisations
Political office-holders in the United Kingdom